Elizabeth D'Onofrio (born October 23, 1957, in New York City) is an American film producer, actress, and acting coach.

Career
She conducts Audition Workshops throughout the U.S. She is also one of the founders of the RiverRun International Film Festival in Winston-Salem, North Carolina along with her brother Vincent and their father Gene D'Onofrio. She was also involved in the Naples Film Festival, Fort Myers Film Festival, and is the talent and film coordinator for The Fort Myers Beach Film Festival.

Recent acting roles include Romantic Rewrite, The Right Stuff, "The Neapolitan", Simple Things, Awaken the Dawn, Dear Angry (2005) and The Chocolate Fetish (2004). D'Onofrio teaches TV and Film Acting Skills at Curtain Call Studios in Fort Myers, FL.

D'Onofrio was cast as Doris in National Geographic's The Right Stuff on Disney+.

Personal life 
D'Onofrio lives on Fort Myers Beach, Florida. Her younger brother is actor Vincent D'Onofrio.

Filmography

Film

Television

References

External links
Official site

American film actresses
American film producers
1957 births
Living people
American women film producers
21st-century American women